Northern Vietnam, Central Vietnam  and Southern Vietnam are the three main historical, geographical and cultural regions within Vietnam. Each region consists of subregions, with considerable cultural differences originating from each subregions.

Northern Vietnam (Bắc Bộ) includes the following subregions:
 Northeast (Đông Bắc Bộ)
 Northwest (Tây Bắc Bộ)
 Red River Delta (Châu thổ sông Hồng or Đồng bằng sông Hồng)

Central Vietnam (Trung Bộ) includes the following subregions:
 North Central Coast (Bắc Trung Bộ)
 South Central Coast (Duyên hải Nam Trung Bộ)
 Central Highlands (Tây Nguyên – "Western Highlands")

Southern Vietnam (Nam Bộ) includes the following subregions:
 Southeast (Đông Nam Bộ)
 Mekong River Delta (Đồng bằng sông Cửu Long or Tây Nam Bộ - "Southwest")

Historical context

 
The Red River Delta in Northern Vietnam is the traditional homeland of the ethnic Vietnamese (Kinh people) where various Bronze Age cultures such as Phùng Nguyên and Đông Sơn originated over 4000 years ago. Through migration and conquests, Vietnamese people gradually spread south in a process called Nam Tiến (Advancing South).

Central Vietnam was home to Cham people, a Malayo-Polynesian ethnic group who founded their distinct Indianised Kingdom over the Central Coast before being subdued by the Vietnamese during the 14th century. Their predecessors, people who are now known as the Sa Huỳnh culture, dated back from 1000 BCE.

The Mekong Delta in southernmost Vietnam was part of Funan, Chenla then Angkor Empire. Chinese and Vietnamese started migrating en masse to this region during the 16th to 17th century.

Northern and Southern Vietnam was a fluid concept that changed constantly during the course of history. During the Northern and Southern dynasties (1533–1592), Vietnam was partitioned with the Mạc dynasty holding the Red River Delta and Lê dynasty controlling the Central Region from Nghệ An to Bình Định while Champa and the Khmers still held their polities further south.

During the Trịnh–Nguyễn War and from 1627 to 1777, two ruling Lords existed in the country with the border (mostly) being the Gianh River in Quảng Bình Province. The North, called Đàng Ngoài (Outer Realm) was ruled by the Trịnh Lords and Nguyễn lords in the South, called Đàng Trong (Inner Realm) or Quảng Nam Quốc, with Lê emperors still nominally acting as head of state.  The two sides ruled their own domain independent of the other, and frequently fought each other.  The imposed separation encouraged the two regions to develop their own cultures.

After the Tay Son Wars (1771–1785) and the founding of the Nguyễn dynasty, the country started getting the present shape with the center of power now switched to Huế in Central Vietnam. During French colonialism, the French divided the country into three parts, directly ruling over Cochinchina (southern Vietnam) while establishing protectorates in Annam (central Vietnam) and Tonkin (northern Vietnam).  Consequently, Cochinchina was more directly influenced by French culture than the other two regions. Hanoi, being the capital of French Indochina, was the only place in Northern Vietnam with significant French influence.

From 1954 to 1976, Vietnam was again divided into two separate countries, it divided by the Bến Hải River in Quảng Trị Province at the 17th parallel, with the North led by a communist government, and the South by one that was nationalist. Although the nation has been united since 2 July 1976, linguistic, cultural, and other differences serve to delineate the two regions from one another, with accompanying stereotypes.

The largest city in the North is Hanoi, the nation's capital; and the country's economic capital and largest city in the South today is Ho Chi Minh City (usually called Saigon).

Cultural differences
The cultural differences between the regions can be divided into two main categories: "tangible" cultural differences such as traditional clothing, cuisine, and so on; and "intangible" cultural differences dealing with stereotypes of behavior, attitude and such between the people of these two regions. Discussions of inherent differences between people in the North and in the South are prohibited and can be classified as "reactionary" in Vietnamese state-controlled media or ''undermining national unity''.

Perceived traits and stereotypes
While relations between the two groups are generally civil, the increased contact due to the influx of northerners into South since the start of the Vietnam War have given rise to very many stereotypes about people from so different regions; etc.:
 Northerners, especially Hanoians, tend to view themselves as more cultured and refined.
 Southerners consider themselves more dynamic, and tolerant.
 Northerners are more concerned about status and appearances.
 Southerners are more liberal with their money while Northerners are more thrifty.
 Northerners are more conservative and afraid of change, while Southerners are more dynamic.
 Southerners are more Westernized, while northerners are more Chinese, East European, Socialist and Communist-influenced
 Southerners are more direct while the northerners are more formal

Cuisine

Cuisine is one of the cultural differences between the regions. Northern Vietnam being the "cradle" of ethnic Vietnamese civilization, bears many of Vietnam's signature dishes (such as Phở and Bún chả). The cuisine is perceived to be complex in ingredients but simplistic in flavours.

The South's cuisine has been influenced by the cuisines of southern Chinese immigrants and indigenous Cambodians, and thus Southerners prefer sweet and sour flavors, respectively, in many dishes. Examples of sour-flavored food items include Canh chua and green mango salad/green papaya salad. Southern cookery also tends to use a significantly larger variety of fresh ingredients while Northern cuisine much relies on preserved and dried goods. The cuisines of Southern Vietnam and Cambodia also share considerable similarities in ingredients, cooking style and food dishes, such as Hủ tiếu Nam Vang.

Central Vietnamese cooking is distinct from the cuisines of both the Northern and Southern regions, in its use of many small side dishes and requiring more complex preparation (ingredient prep, cooking, serving, etc.). The royal cuisine of Hue places greater importance and food presentation, examples like Bánh bèo and Bánh bột lọc. It is also distinctive in its spiciness when compared to its counterparts, for example in Bún bò Huế. Food items from this region also tend to be lesser in size of individual portions. Central Vietnam dishes also feature a large amount of seafood.

Certain unusual foods are more prevalent in one region than in another.  For example, dog meat is much more popular in the North than in the South. Cat meat is also eaten in Northern parts of the country. Similarly, certain seafood dishes and game meat, such as basa fish or grilled rodent meat,  while popular in other parts of the country, is uncommon in the North.

Southern Vietnam has a renowned coffee culture while tea is the preferred beverage in the North.

Clothing

Traditional clothes are also often used to symbolize different regions. In women's attire, commonly the Áo tứ thân is associated with the North, the Áo dài with the central region (due to its emergence in the Vietnamese royal court in the 18th century), and the Áo bà ba in the South (although many of these clothes are worn across different regions). However, the áo dài is now a very popular and widely worn ladies' attire nationwide.

Linguistic differences

The Vietnamese language features many accents, the three major dialects are those of the North, Center, and South with major differences in phonology and vocabulary. Due to cultural prominence, the Hanoi and Saigon accents are mostly intelligible to speakers from other regions. The Central accent, in particular from the provinces of Nghệ An, Hà Tĩnh, Quảng Bình, Quảng Nam, and Quảng Ngãi is often unintelligible to speakers outside of these regions.

Differences in these accents lie in several different factors, including but not limited to the following:
 Pronunciation of words, an example would be: a Hanoi <d> is pronounced like the English /z/ while a Saigon <d> is pronounced like the English /j/.
 Northern Vietnamese has the full 6 tones, whereas Southern Vietnamese has only 5 (merging two of the tones into one)
 Words ending in "nh" are pronounced differently between North and South (See Vietnamese phonology for details)
 Merging of the "tr" and "ch" sounds in Northern Vietnamese
 Some differences in vocabulary between different regions
 Northerners speak with a higher-pitched accent and frequently pronounce words with a /z/ (even though the letter <z> doesn't exist in the Vietnamese Latin alphabet).
 Central Vietnamese (in the North-Central Coast, from Nghệ An to Thừa Thiên – Huế) speak in a high-pitched, diverse accents. In areas of Nghệ An, people living in different villages could speak in completely different accents.
 Southerners, along with the South Central Coast provinces of Bình Định, Phú Yên, Khánh Hòa, Ninh Thuận and Bình Thuận, speak in a more lower-pitched, more monotone accent, which is also found in the accents of various aboriginal languages spoken by Montagnard hill tribe ethnicities.

In Central Vietnamese, the number of tones is reduced to 5 (om Quảng Trị and Huế accents) or only 4 (in Hà Tĩnh, Nghệ An and Quảng Bình accents). One of the distinctive feature of Central Vietnamese and Quảng Nam accent is the use of a different set of particles and pronouns, making it stand apart from Northern and Southern Vietnamese. For example, chi, mô, tê, răng and rứa  (what, where, that, why and thus) are used instead of gì, đâu, kìa, sao and vậy in Standard Vietnamese.

While these differences may seem superficial to non-Vietnamese speakers, even the difference in phonology. The vocabularies of the different regions also differ – between Northern and Southern Vietnamese is quite striking.

Kinship terms are especially affected, as each term has a subtly different meaning in each region. In the South, the eldest child in a family is referred by the ordinal number two, while in the North "number two" refers to the second-eldest child. The vocabularies of the different regions also differ. Vocabulary differences can be confusing as sometimes the same word could have different meaning in each dialects. For example, the word mận refers to two different fruits: it is used for Prunus salicina (a type of plum) in the North, while in the South it refers to Syzygium samarangense (the rose apple). Similarly; chè is a dessert in Southern Vietnamese but in the Northern it has two meanings: tea and chè, ốm means sick in Northern Vietnamese and thin in Southern Vietnamese. "Bông" refers to flower in Southern Vietnamese but means cotton in Northern Vietnamese, and the word địt refers to flatuence in the South but means "fuck" in the North.

Differences in climate

While the entire country lies in the tropics, there is quite a large difference in climate between Northern and Southern Vietnam.

Northern Vietnam has a humid subtropical climate, with a full four seasons, with much cooler temperatures than in the South (which has a tropical savanna climate), as well as winters that can get quite cold, sometimes with frost and even (rarely) snowfall. Snow can even be found to an extent up in the mountains of the extreme Northern regions in places such as Sapa and Lạng Sơn.

Southern Vietnam, with has a tropical climate, has only two main seasons: a dry season and a rainy season.

Miscellaneous cultural differences 
 While Southern Vietnamese often ring in the Lunar New Year (Tết) with yellow mai (Ochna integerrima) blossoms, Northern Vietnamese often prefer hoa đào (peach) blossoms.

Names 

During French Indochina these regions were named in Vietnamese as Bắc Kỳ (北圻), Trung Kỳ (中圻), and Nam Kỳ (南圻). During the Empire of Vietnam (a Japanese puppet state) these regions were renamed to Bắc Bộ (北部), Trung Bộ (中部), and Nam Bộ (南部) by Prime Minister Trần Trọng Kim. Following the creation of the State of Vietnam and the establishment of its government, the Chief of State Bảo Đại signed the two ordinances related to the administration and local governance of the State of Vietnam, namely Ordinance No. 1 ("Organisation and Operation of civil authorities in Vietnam") and Ordinance No. 2 ("Statutes of Government office"). These ordinances renamed the regions to Bắc Việt (北越), Trung Việt (中越), and Nam Việt (南越). Later on 4 August 1954 the government of the State of Vietnam enacted Ordinance No. 21 which renamed the regions to Bắc phần (北分), Trung phần (中分), and Nam phần (南分). On 24 October 1956 the South Vietnamese president Ngô Đình Diệm officially abolished the three region system as the regions were divided into smaller regions in South Vietnam.

See also

 Geographical exonyms: Tonkin and Cochinchina
 Nam tiến
 Northern and Southern dynasties (Vietnam)
 Partition of Vietnam: North Vietnam and South Vietnam
 Trịnh–Nguyễn War: Đàng Ngoài and Đàng Trong
 Vietnam under French rule: Tonkin, Annam, and Cochinchina

References

External links
 Article about distinctions and stereotypes between northern and southern Vietnamese
 Article on Vietnam including climate information
  Article on Vietnam tourist including some information about Hanoi and Saigon

Geography of Vietnam
Regions of Vietnam
Regions of Southeast Asia
Vietnamese culture